William Fisher Hunter Carson, OBE (born 16 November 1942) is a retired jockey in thoroughbred horse racing.

Life and career

Best known as "Willie", Carson was born in Stirling, Scotland in 1942. He was apprenticed to Captain Gerald Armstrong at his stables at Tupgill, North Yorkshire. His first winner in Britain was Pinker's Pond in a seven-furlong apprentice handicap at Catterick Bridge Racecourse on 19 July 1962.

He was British Champion Jockey five times (1972, 1973, 1978, 1980 and 1983), won 17 British Classic Races, and passed 100 winners in a season 23 times for a total of 3,828 wins, making him the fourth most successful jockey in Great Britain.

Willie Carson's best season as a jockey came in 1990 when he rode 187 winners. This included riding six winners at Newcastle Racecourse on 30 June, making Carson one of only four jockeys to ride six winners at one meeting during the 20th century. However, he came second in the 1990 jockeys' championship to Pat Eddery (who rode 209 winners).

Carson had a long association with trainer Major Dick Hern for whom he rode his first three Derby winners.  Five feet tall and riding at an easily maintained weight of  Carson was much in demand as a jockey up to his retirement in 1996 at the age of 54.

In 1980, he took over the Minster House Stud at Ampney Crucis near Cirencester and he and his wife Elaine have developed it into a state of the art stud complex. He is almost certainly the only jockey in the 20th century to have ridden a horse that he bred, Minster Son, to victory in one of the Classic races, the St. Leger Stakes 1988.  He and his ex-wife Carol had three sons Anthony, Neil, and Ross.

In 1983, Willie Carson was made an Officer of the Order of the British Empire for his services to horse racing.

From 1982 to 1983 Carson joined Bill Beaumont as one of the team captains for A Question of Sport. With Clare Balding, Carson co-presented BBC horse racing on BBC1 until the BBC ended their racing coverage at the end of the 2012 season.

He was chairman of Swindon Town FC from 2001 until August 2007 when, following a takeover of the club by Best Holdings SGPS S.A, he was replaced by Jim Little.

In November 2010, he was awarded an honorary doctorate by University of Chester.

In 2011, he came 5th in the eleventh series of ITV1's reality television show I'm a Celebrity...Get Me Out of Here!

Major wins
 1,000 Guineas – (2) – Salsabil (1990), Shadayid (1993)
 2,000 Guineas – (4) – High Top (1972), Known Fact (1980), Don't Forget Me (1987), Nashwan (1989)
 Ascot Gold Cup – (3) – Little Wolf (1983), Longboat (1986), Sadeem (1989)
 Champion Stakes – (1) – Rose Bowl (1975)
 Cork and Orrery Stakes (Diamond Jubilee Stakes) – (5) – Parsimony (1972), Swingtime (1975), Dafayna (1985), Danehill (1989), Atraf (1996)
 Derby – (4) – Troy (1979), Henbit (1980), Nashwan (1989), Erhaab (1994)
 Dewhurst Stakes – (3) – Prince of Dance (1988, dead heat), Dr Devious (1991), Alhaarth (1995)
 Eclipse Stakes – (3) – Ela-Mana-Mou (1980), Nashwan (1989), Elmaamul (1990)
 Falmouth Stakes – (2) – Cistus (1978), Rose Above (1979)
 Fillies' Mile – (2) – Quick As Lightning (1979), Aqaarid (1994)
 Haydock Sprint Cup – (3) – Boldboy (1977), Habibti (1983), Dayjur (1990)
 International Stakes – (3) – Relkino (1977), Troy (1979), Shady Heights (1988)
 July Cup – (2) – Habibti (1983), Hamas (1993)
 King George VI and Queen Elizabeth Stakes – (4) – Troy (1979), Ela-Mana-Mou (1980), Petoski (1985), Nashwan (1989)
 King's Stand Stakes – (3) – Habibti (1984), Chilibang (1988), Dayjur (1990)
 Lockinge Stakes – (2) – Relkino (1977), Wassl (1984, dead heat)
 Middle Park Stakes – (4) – Sharpen Up (1971), Known Fact (1979), Rodrigo de Triano (1991), Fard (1994)
 Nassau Stakes – (1) – Cistus (1978)
 Nunthorpe Stakes – (3) – Bay Express (1975), Habibti (1983), Dayjur (1990)
 Oaks – (4) – Dunfermline (1977), Bireme (1980), Sun Princess (1983), Salsabil (1990)
 Prince of Wales's Stakes – (4) – Ela-Mana-Mou (1980), Morcon (1984), Muhtarram (1994 & 1995)
 Queen Anne Stakes – (1) – Lahib (1992)
 Queen Elizabeth II Stakes – (8) – Rose Bowl (1975 & 1976), Trusted (1977), Homing (1978), Known Fact (1980), Teleprompter (1984), Lahib (1992), Bahri (1995)
 Racing Post Trophy – (3) – High Top (1971), Emmson (1987), Al Hareb (1988)
 St. James's Palace Stakes – (2) – Marju (1991), Bahri (1995)
 St. Leger – (3) – Dunfermline (1977), Sun Princess (1983), Minster Son (1988)
 Sun Chariot Stakes – (4) – Duboff (1975), Dusty Dollar (1986), Ristna (1991), Talented (1993)
 Sussex Stakes – (1) – Distant Relative (1990)
 Yorkshire Oaks – (5) – Dibidale (1974), Sun Princess (1983), Circus Plume (1984), Roseate Tern (1989), Hellenic (1990)

 France
 Poule d'Essai des Pouliches – (1) – Ta Rib (1996)
 Prix de l'Abbaye de Longchamp – (2) – Habibti (1983), Dayjur (1990)
 Prix de Diane – (1) – Rafha (1990)
 Prix de la Forêt – (2) – Roan Star (1975), Salse (1988)
 Prix du Jockey Club – (1) – Policeman (1980)
 Prix Marcel Boussac – (3) – Ashayer (1987), Salsabil (1989), Shadayid (1990)
 Prix Morny – (1) – Deep Roots (1982)
 Prix de l'Opéra – (2) – Cistus (1978), Dione (1982)
 Prix Royal-Oak – (1) – Niniski (1979)
 Prix de la Salamandre – (1) – Deep Roots (1982, dead heat)
 Prix Vermeille – (1) – Salsabil (1990)

 Germany
 Bayerisches Zuchtrennen – (2) – Highland Chieftain (1986), Shady Heights (1988)
 Grosser Preis von Baden – (1) – Sharper (1976)
 Grosser Preis von Berlin – (1) – First Lord (1978)
 Preis von Europa – (1) – Prince Ippi (1972)

 Ireland
 Irish 1,000 Guineas – (2) – Mehthaaf (1994), Matiya (1996)
 Irish 2,000 Guineas – (1) – Don't Forget Me (1987)
 Irish Champion Stakes – (2) – Elmaamul (1990), Muhtarram (1993)
 Irish Derby – (2) – Troy (1979), Salsabil (1990)
 Irish Oaks – (4) – Dibidale (1974), Shoot A Line (1980), Swiftfoot (1982), Helen Street (1985)
 Irish St. Leger – (1) – Niniski (1979)
 Matron Stakes – (1) – Llyn Gwynant (1988)
 Tattersalls Gold Cup – (1) – Fair of the Furze (1986)

 Italy
 Derby Italiano – (2) – Red Arrow (1976), Tommy Way (1986)
 Gran Criterium – (1) – Sanam (1986)
 Gran Premio di Milano – (2) – Tommy Way (1986), Alwuhush (1989)
 Oaks d'Italia – (1) – Miss Gris (1985)
 Premio Lydia Tesio – (1) – Oumaldaaya (1992)
 Premio Parioli – (1) – Alhijaz (1992)
 Premio Presidente della Repubblica – (3) – Jalmood (1983), Alwuhush (1989), Muhtarram (1994)
 Premio Roma – (2) – High Hawk (1983), Highland Chieftain (1989)
 Premio Vittorio di Capua – (2) – Alhijaz (1992 & 1993)

In popular culture
The British progressive rock band It Bites' song "Once Around The World" (from the album of the same name) contains the lyric "Willie Carson, done for arson, for burning up the track".

References

External links
 Racingbase.com – Racing People: Willie Carson

1942 births
Living people
Sportspeople from Stirling
Scottish jockeys
Lester Award winners
BBC sports presenters and reporters
Officers of the Order of the British Empire
British Champion flat jockeys
Swindon Town F.C. directors and chairmen
I'm a Celebrity...Get Me Out of Here! (British TV series) participants